Rosebud Benitez is a Filipina celebrity chef and the host of Quickfire, a 10-minute television cooking show broadcast several times daily on GMA News TV (formerly known as Q, now GTV), a sister station of GMA Network. The show is considered to be one of the most easily recognizable productions of the alternative network, with an offshoot bestselling DVD compilation of highlight episodes. Before Quickfire, Benitez was part of the culinary group program Ka-Toque, Q’s first-of-a-kind that spawned a whole new generation of broadcast cuisine productions and chef-hosts. Though wedged within a smorgasbord of equally sociable young chefs in Ka-Toque, Benitez became the first in the group to be given a solo show and the only non-actress to be invited by GMA Artist Center to join its register of contract stars.

After graduating from the prestigious Center for Culinary Arts, Manila, Benitez (who has the nickname “Chef Mom”) has become a popular public culinary figure in the Philippines, gracing billboards for the food company Ajinomoto and achieving status as a most requested chef to conduct cooking demonstrations for corporate events and TV programs. She has hosted and presented several media and live events and has appeared as a guest in several TV productions of varying formats and genres. She has also been featured in lifestyle magazines, broadsheets, photo exhibits, and food blogs on wmn.ph; selected as one of the seven society women to represent the scent of S.T. Dupont Rose in Manila; nominated in the 2009 and 2010 PMPC Star Awards for TV; and honored as one of People Asia’s “Women of Style and Substance” for 2009.

Benitez lives in Quezon City with her children Katrina and Kyle.

Filmography

Television
 Ka-Toque: Lutong Barkada (2005 to 2009), QTV/Q (now GTV)
Quickfire: 10-Minute Kitchen Wonders (as solo host, 2007 to 2012), Q/GMA News TV (now GTV)

References

External links 
 Pinay Celebrity Online: “Quickfire Chef-Host Rosebud Benitez—My Favorite Chef”
 Spot.Ph: “10 Prettiest Chefs in Manila”
 The Philippine Star: “Cook it up with Rosebud”
 Philippine Daily Inquirer: Entertainment: “Celeb chef cooks up new home look”
 Telebisyon.Net: “Quickfire’s easy-to-cook dishes out on video”
 GMA Pinoy TV: “Quickfire”
 Quickfire on Multiply
 Chef Rosebud Benitez on Tumblr
 Chef Rosebud Benitez on Twitter
 Chef Rosebud Benitez on Facebook

1977 births
Living people
People from Quezon City
Filipino chefs
Filipino television presenters
Filipino television chefs
GMA Network personalities
Women chefs
Filipino women television presenters